Gioacchino Pagliei  (born 1852 in Subiaco, Lazio, died 1896 in Rome) was an Italian painter who worked in the Neo-Pompeian genre.

Education and career
Pagliei studied in Rome at the Accademia di San Luca, where in 1871 he won an award for a drawing and essay. In 1875, he won the Stanziani competition.

A follower of F. Grandi, he worked on the decoration of the church of San Lorenzo in Damaso. He also worked at the Palazzo del Quirinale and the Villino Gamberini.

His oil painting style followed the Neo-Pompeian genre.

He was introduced to the Società degli Amatori e Cultori delle Belle Arti in the 1880s where he exhibited A Costume of the Empire, 1882; The Embarrassment, 1884; and  Nella scala, 1895–1896.

Works
Pagliei's works include:
 The Naiads, 1881
 Gallant Dragoon
 The Finishing Touches
 La danza 
 At the Ball
 Young Girls Dancing by a Fountain
 A Costume of the Empire, 1882
 The Embarrassment, 1884
 Nella scala, 1895–1896.

References

1852 births
1896 deaths
19th-century Italian painters
Italian male painters
Neo-Pompeian painters
19th-century Italian male artists